The African Child (French: L'Enfant noir) is an autobiographical French novel by Camara Laye published in 1953. It tells the story of a young African child, Baba, growing up in Guinea. The novel won the Prix Charles Veillon writing prize. 

It was translated into English by James Kirkup and Ernest Jones and published in the United States by Farrar, Straus and Giroux in 1954 as The Dark Child. In the United Kingdom, this translation was published under the title The African Child in 1959.

It was adapted into a movie called L'Enfant noir in 1995. Many of the cast in the film were relatives of Laye.

The scenes early in the novel, when the young narrator witnesses his father working with gold, have drawn considerable critical attention for their spiritual overtones, but also because of the importance of the douga, the song and dance begun by the griot when the work is complete.

Publication history 

 The Dark Child: The Autobiography of an African Boy (New York: Farrar, Straus and Giroux, 1954)
 The African Child (London: Fontana, 1959)

References

1953 French novels
French-language novels
Novels set in Africa
French novels adapted into films
Autobiographical novels
Plon (publisher) books